Lennox Elementary School District is a public school district based in Lennox, an unincorporated area in Los Angeles County, California, United States.

The district serves a few sections of Hawthorne.

The district was established in 1910.

Schools
Lower secondary:
 Lennox Middle School

Primary:
 Buford Elementary School
 Felton Elementary School
 Dolores Huerta Elementary School
 Jefferson Elementary School
 Moffett Elementary School

Other:
 School Readiness Center
 Lennox State Preschool
 Lennox Virtual Academy

References

External links
 

School districts in Los Angeles County, California
1910 establishments in California
School districts established in 1910